Established in 1982, the Ontario College of Certified Social Workers (OCCSW) provided an avenue for Social Workers in Ontario to voluntarily certify themselves in the profession.

The OCCSW was replaced by the Ontario College of Social Workers and Social Service Workers in 1998.

Past Chairpersons
 Shannon McCorquodale - 1982 to 1986
 Leonard Levine - 1986 to 1988
 Joanne Turner - 1988 to 1990
 Raymond D. Tremblay - 1990 to 1993
 David Rivard - 1993 to 1996

References

Medical and health organizations based in Ontario
1982 establishments in Ontario
Social care in Canada
Regulatory colleges